= List of executive orders by Manuel Roxas =

Listed below are executive orders signed by Philippine President Manuel Roxas.

== 1946 ==
No.	Title	Date signed
110	Prescribing the office hours to be observed effective June 1, 1946, in all Government bureaus and offices, including the provincial, city and municipal governments	May 30, 1946
1	Prescribing rules and regulations for the granting and issuing of passports	July 4, 1946
2	Organizing certain barrios of the municipality of Calbiga, province of Samar, into an independent municipality under the name of Pinabacdao	July 8, 1946
3	On the control of exports from the Philippines	July 10, 1946
4	Fixing the salaries and allowances of the officers and enlisted men of the Philippine Army	July 11, 1946
5	Creating a Council of State	July 12, 1946
6	Promulgating rules and regulations governing the construction, installation and operation of radio transmitting stations, radio receiving stations for commercial purposes of television or radio broadcasting stations under temporary permits issued by the President	July 17, 1946
7	Reorganizing the Deportation Board	July 18, 1946
8	Amending Paragraphs (8) and (9) of Executive Order No. 161, dated August 23, 1938, entitled "Promulgating regulations to govern the administration and collection of delinquent irrigation fees from landowners under irrigation systems constructed under the provisions of Act No. 2152, as amended, fixing adjusted irrigation fees for said systems and prescribing the manner of collecting same, and revoking Executive Order No. 142, dated February 15, 1938	July 22, 1946
9	Amending Paragraph 1 of Executive Order No. 320, dated January 27, 1941, entitled "Regulating the maintenance and operation of race tracks and horse racing"	July 29, 1946
10	Fixing the allowances of the flight personnel of the Philippine Army Air Force, restoring the longevity pay for the Philippine Army, and for other purposes	July 31, 1946
11	Creating a Board of Surveys	July 31, 1946
12	Reorganizing the Quezon Memorial Committee, created under Executive Order Numbered Seventy-Nine, dated 17 December 1945	August 19, 1946
13	Prohibiting the exportation of timber, lumber and logs to the United States of America	August 26, 1946
14	Authorizing the collection of an annual membership voluntary contribution of Fifty Centavos from pupils enrolled in the public schools for the support and maintenance of school medical and dental services	August 28, 1946
15	Amending Paragraph Numbered Twenty-Two of Executive Order Numbered One, dated July Four, Nineteen Hundred and Forty-Six, entitled "Prescribing rules and regulations for the granting and issuing of passports"	September 5, 1946
16	Further amending the Third Paragraph of Executive Order No. 33, dated May 29, 1936, as amended by Executive Orders Nos. 257 and 7, dated March 12, 1940 and July 18, 1946, respectively, reorganizing the Deportation Board	September 5, 1946
17	Annexing the barrios of Villa and Pagud of the municipality of Bongabon, province of Nueva Ecija, to the municipality of Laur, same province	September 5, 1946
18	Establishing the organization and operation of the Department of Foreign Affairs and of the Foreign Service of the Republic of the Philippines and fixing the emoluments, privileges and allowances of the officers and employees thereof	September 16, 1946
19	Organizing a certain portion of the municipality of Vallehermoso, province of Oriental Negros, into an independent municipality under the name of Canlaon	October 11, 1946
20	Amending Executive Order Numbered Four, dated July Eleventh, Nineteen Hundred and Forty-Six, entitled "Fixing the salaries and allowances of the officers and enlisted men of the Philippine Army"	October 15, 1946
21	Fixing Wednesday, January 1, 1947, as Census Day	October 15, 1946
22	Amending Paragraph (d), Section 5, of Executive Order No. 6, dated July 17, 1946, entitled "Promulgating rules and regulations governing the construction, installation and operation of radio transmitting stations, radio receiving stations for commercial purposes of television or radio broadcasting stations under temporary permits issued by the President"	October 16, 1946
23	Amending Section 2 of Executive Order No. 3, dated July 10, 1946, entitled "On the control of exports from the Philippines"	November 1, 1946
24	Creating the National Advisory Health Council	November 12, 1946
25	Changing the membership of the Flood Control Commission created in Executive Order No. 68, dated 1 December 1936	November 15, 1946
26	Amending Executive Order No. 304, dated October 8, 1940, entitled "Creating Investigating Committees on Veterans' Pension, requiring provincial, city and municipal treasurers to perform certain duties in connection with such pension and enjoining all officers and employees of the Philippine Government to render necessary assistance to applicants therefor"	November 15, 1946
27	Creating the Surplus Property Commission to take charge of the acceptance, administration, sale and disposition of the surplus property acquired by the Government of the Republic of the Philippines from the Government of the United States of America	November 18, 1946
28	Directing the Metropolitan Transportation Service (METRAN) to furnish transportation facilities to bureaus and offices of the National Government	November 22, 1946
29	Providing for the administration and disposition of properties or property rights in the province and in the city of Davao transferred to the Republic of the Philippines by the United States of America under the Philippine Property Act of 1946, and other properties of the Government therein situated which are now being administered by the Bureau of Lands	November 25, 1946
30	Extending the periods provided for in Sections 3, 5, and 6 of Republic Act No. 17, entitled "An Act to provide for the circulation of treasury certificates with the Official Seal of the Republic of the Philippines stamped, printed or superimposed thereon, and for other purposes"	November 26, 1946
31	Creating the Shipping Commission	November 28, 1946
32	Extending further the period provided for in Sections 3, 5, and 6 of Republic Act No. 17, entitled "An Act to provide for the circulation of treasury certificates with the Official Seal of the Republic of the Philippines stamped, printed or superimposed thereon, and for other purposes"	December 23, 1946
33	Promulgating rules and regulations to carry out the provisions of Republic Act Numbered Thirty entitled "An Act authorizing the payment, under certain conditions, of a gratuity to the widow and/or children, and in their absence to the other heirs, of a deceased officer or member of any police force or similar Governmental organization engaged in the maintenance of peace and order, appropriating funds therefor"	December 27, 1946
34	Designating the barrio of Baroy in the municipality of Tubod, province of Lanao, as the seat of the municipal government thereof	December 27, 1946

== 1947 ==
No.	Title	Date signed
35	Prescribing the fees for milling palay	January 3, 1947
36	Annexing the barrio of Marco of the municipality of Allacapan, province of Cagayan, to barrio Centro, the poblacion of said municipality	January 4, 1947
37	Reorganizing the Deportation Board	January 4, 1947
38	Providing for the Coat of Arms, Seal, and Flag of the President and vice-president of the Philippines	January 7, 1947
39	Increasing the number of barrios of the municipal district of Banaue, Mountain Province, from seven to twelve	January 13, 1947
40	Creating the Council of National Defense	January 13, 1947
41	Extending further the periods provided for in Sections 3, 5, and 6 of Republic Act No. 17, entitled "An Act to provide for the circulation of treasury certificates with the Official Seal of the Republic of the Philippines stamped, printed or superimposed thereon, and for other purposes"	January 24, 1947
42	Waiving the additional progressive taxes for the 1945-1946 crop to be collected from and paid by the proprietors or operators of sugar mills	February 5, 1947
43	Transferring from the General Auditing Office the function of preparing and keeping the accounts of the various departments, bureaus, offices and dependencies of the National Government, including the Supreme Court, the Court of Appeals, the People's Court, the Commission on Elections and the University of the Philippines, the function of acting upon requisitions or orders for supplies, materials, furniture and equipment, and the function of operating the salvage warehouse	February 7, 1947
44	Lifting the prohibition and/or limitation against importation of cattle into the Philippines	February 17, 1947
45	Transferring the seat of government of the municipal district of Tabuk, Mountain Province, from Naneng to Laya	February 17, 1947
46	Extending further the periods provided for in Sections 3, 5, and 6 of Republic Act No. 17, entitled "An Act to provide for the circulation of treasury certificates with the Official Seal of the Republic of the Philippines stamped, printed or superimposed thereon, and for other purposes," as amended by Republic Act Numbered Ninety-Two	March 8, 1947
47	Amending Section 3 of Executive Order No. 3, dated July 10, 1946, entitled "On the control of exports from the Philippines"	March 17, 1947
48	Creating the Code Commission	March 20, 1947
49	Fixing office hours during the hot season	March 28, 1947
50	Authorizing officers of the Philippine Army assigned in the Victoriano Luna General Hospital to receive the same rates of rental allowance as those enjoyed by officers assigned in the City of Manila	March 28, 1947
51	Amending Executive Order No. 172, dated October 18, 1938, entitled "Regulations governing the use of motor vehicles or other means of transportation for official purposes"	April 12, 1947
52	Fixing the pay and allowance of students of the Philippine Military Academy	April 21, 1947
53	Terminating the collection of tolls at the Zapote Bridge, Cavite, and turning over the administration of the bridge to the provincial board of the said province	April 21, 1947
54	Transferring the powers, duties and functions of the Treasurer of the Philippines pertaining to insurance, mutual benefit, relief and benevolent societies and associations, and trusts for charitable uses to the Bank Commissioner, and for other purposes	April 21, 1947
55	Extending further the periods provided for in Sections 3, 5, and 6 of Republic Act No. 17, entitled "An Act to provide for the circulation of treasury certificates with the Official Seal of the Republic of the Philippines stamped, printed or superimposed thereon, and for other purposes," as amended by Republic Act No. 92	May 31, 1947
56	Designating the Government boards of examiners as technical advisory committees to the Office of Private Education, and empowering the Director of Private Education to call upon technical and professional employees of the Government for advice on matters affecting technical, professional and/or vocational courses in private educational institutions, and for assistance in the inspection of said institutions offering technical, professional and/or vocational courses	June 2, 1947
57	Creating a board of directors for the Metropolitan Transportation Service	June 7, 1947
58	Designating the National Development Company as the Agency to accept bids and to enter into contracts with successful bidders for the collection of scrap iron, steel, copper, brass, lead and other metal products on land or under water or to collect and dispose of same	June 9, 1947
59	Extending the period of registration and deposit of emergency currency under the provisions of Republic Act Numbered Twenty-Two	June 9, 1947
60	Designating the Philippine National Bank as fiscal agent of the Republic of the Philippines in the United States and for other purposes	June 16, 1947
61	Amending Executive Order No. 27, dated November 18, 1946, creating the Surplus Property Commission	June 20, 1947
62	Regulating rentals for houses and lots for residential buildings	June 21, 1947
63	Reducing the Appropriation "For salaries and other expenses of advisers and consultants in foreign affairs" authorized in Republic Act No. 80, Item D-IV-3, from ₱50,000.00 to ₱30,000.00, and allotting the amount of ₱20,000.00 for a fund to be expended in the discretion of the Secretary of Foreign Affairs	June 24, 1947
64	Further amending Executive Order No. 304, dated October 8, 1940, as amended by Executive Order No. 26, dated November 15, 1946, creating Investigating Committees on Veterans' Pensions	June 24, 1947
65	Permitting limited exportation of logs and flitches subject to certain conditions	June 27, 1947
66	Fixing the ceiling prices of lumber and for other purposes	June 27, 1947
67	Organizing certain portions of the barrios of San Isidro and Bugsoc, municipality of Sierra Bullones, province of Bohol, into an independent barrio under the name of La Union	July 12, 1947
68	Establishing a National War Crimes Office and prescribing rules and regulations governing the trial of accused war criminals	July 29, 1947
69	Requiring aliens charged before the Deportation Board with collaboration with the enemy to file bond for appearance	July 29, 1947
70	Declaring civilian volunteers who were members of recognized guerilla units as having the equivalent training of those who have completed trainee instruction and as constituting a part of the reserve units	July 29, 1947
71	Saving under certain conditions validly existing concessions or licenses to cut timber within the area reserved under Proclamation No. 29 from the operation thereof	July 29, 1947
72	Organizing the municipal districts of Sudipen, San Gabriel and Pugo, province of La Union, into regular municipalities	July 30, 1947
73	Creating the Radio Broadcasting Board to administer and operate Radio Station KZFM acquired as surplus by the Government of the Republic of the Philippines from the Government of the United States of America	August 12, 1947
74	Physical and medical examination of proposed appointees in the unclassified service and in Government boards, agencies and instrumentalities	August 12, 1947
75	Designating the Cebu Landing Field as a national airport	August 12, 1947
76	Amending Executive Order No. 31, dated November 28, 1946, creating the Shipping Commission	August 12, 1947
77	Amending Paragraph No. 1 of Executive Order No. 33, dated December 27, 1946, entitled "Promulgating rules and regulations to carry out the provisions of Republic Act Numbered Thirty entitled 'An Act authorizing the payment, under certain conditions, of a gratuity to the widow and/or children, and in their absence to the other heirs, of a deceased officer or member of any police force or similar Governmental organization engaged in the maintenance of peace and order, appropriating funds therefor'"	August 12, 1947
78	Segregating the barrio of Aloneros from the municipality of Tagkawayan, Quezon province, and annexing said barrio to the municipality of Guinayangan, same province	August 12, 1947
79	Organizing a portion of the municipality of Sindangan, province of Zamboanga, into an independent municipality under the name of Labason with the seat of government in the barrio of Labason	August 12, 1947
80	Organizing certain portions of the municipalities of Talibon and Ubay, province of Bohol, into an independent municipality under the name of Trinidad	August 14, 1947
81	Creating a Central Bank Council	August 14, 1947
82	Organizing into ten municipalities all, except three, municipal districts in the province of Cotabato and annexing the said three municipal districts to the municipality of Cotabato	August 18, 1947
83	Extending further the periods provided for in Sections 3, 5, and 6 of Republic Act No. 17, entitled "An Act to provide for the circulation of treasury certificates with the Official Seal of the Republic of the Philippines stamped, printed or superimposed thereon, and for other purposes" as amended by Republic Act No. 92	August 21, 1947
84	Transferring the seat of government of the Municipality of Sagay, Negros Occidental, from the Poblacion of Dalusan	August 26, 1947
85	Organizing certain barrios and sitios of the municipality of Plaridel, province of Occidental Misamis, into an independent municipality under the name of Calamba with the seat of government at the barrio of Calamba	September 3, 1947
86	Amending Executive Order No. 24, dated November 12, 1946, entitled "Creating the National Advisory Health Council"	September 3, 1947
87	Further amending Executive Order No. 320, dated January 27, 1941, as amended by Executive Order No. 99, dated March 11, 1946, entitled "Regulating the maintenance and operation of race track and horse racing"	September 3, 1947
88	Waiving the additional progressive taxes for the 1946-1947 crop to be collected from and paid by the proprietors or operators of sugar mills	September 3, 1947
89	Amending Executive Order No. 89, dated August 12, 1947	September 3, 1947
90	Establishing the Philippine Relief and Trade Rehabilitation Administration, dissolving the Philippine Relief and Rehabilitation Administration and the National Trading Corporation, and reorganizing the National Cooperatives Administration	September 10, 1947
91	Revoking Executive Order No. 33, dated April 22, 1913, and lifting the reservation established thereunder	September 26, 1947
92	Authorizing provincial, chartered city and municipal governments to grant living bonus for the fiscal year ending June 30, 1948	September 29, 1947
93	Abolishing the National Enterprises Control Board, creating the Government Enterprises Council, transferring the Metropolitan Transportation Service to the Manila Railroad Company, dissolving and merging certain corporations owned or controlled by the Government, and for other purposes	October 4, 1947
94	Reorganizing the different executive departments, bureaus, offices, and agencies of the Government of the Republic of the Philippines, making certain adjustments of personnel and reallotments of funds in connection therewith, and for other purposes	October 4, 1947
95	Providing for the administration of the Turtle and Mangsee Islands	October 13, 1947
96	Fixing the date or organization and territorial jurisdiction of the city of Dagupan	October 15, 1947
97	Waiving the additional progressive taxes for the 1941-1942 crop to be collected from and paid by the proprietors or operators of sugar mills	October 17, 1947
98	Fixing the clothing allowance and per diems of officers and enlisted men of the Army of the Philippines sent to the U.S. Army Service Schools	October 21, 1947
99	Transferring to the National Abaca and Other Fibers Corporation the administration and disposition of public lands formerly held by aliens or dummy applicants	October 22, 1947
100	Designating the Administrator of the Civil Aeronautics Administration as acting airport administrator of the international airport at Nichols Field and authorizing him to conduct negotiations for the transfer thereof to the Republic of the Philippines	October 23, 1947
101	Restricting the carrying of firearms before, during and after the general elections on November 11, 1947	November 4, 1947
102	Ordering the suspension of all appointments of special agents of the Military Police Command, including those of the G-2 Service of the Military Police Command; of all special agents of the provincial governor, city or municipal mayors within the province of Cavite, and the confiscation of firearms now in their possession	November 4, 1947
103	Adopting measures to insure peace and order and free elections in the province and city of Cavite	November 9, 1947
104	Fixing at Fifty Pesos per month the minimum pay of employees of the National Government enjoying subsistence and/or quarters allowances	November 11, 1947
105	Authorizing the acting air port administrator of the international air port at Nichols Field to execute and sign lease contracts	November 22, 1947
106	Extending further the periods provided for in Sections 3, 5, and 6 of Republic Act No. 17, entitled "An Act to provide for the circulation of treasury certificates with the Official Seal of the Republic of the Philippines stamped, printed or superimposed thereon, and for other purposes," as amended by Republic Act No. 92	November 29, 1947
107	Prohibiting the execution of Government contracts wherein the Government is required to make advance payment for services not yet rendered and/or supplies and materials not yet delivered	December 3, 1947
108	Reorganizing the Lighthouse Board	December 3, 1947
109	Further amending Executive Order No. 320, dated January 27, 1941, as amended by Executive Order No. 99, dated March 11, 1946, and Executive Order No. 87, dated September 3, 1947, entitled "Regulating the maintenance and operation of race track and horse racing"	December 3, 1947
110	Organizing the Philippine mission to the United Nations and providing for its direction and maintenance	December 12, 1947
111	Organizing a certain portion of the municipality of Tolong, province of Oriental Negros, into an independent municipality under the name of Santa Catalina	December 17, 1947
112	Amending Executive Order No. 65, dated June 27, 1947, so as to allow the limited exportation of sawn lumber for a period of six months	December 17, 1947
113	Organizing certain portions of the municipalities of Cuyapo, Guimba, Muñoz, and Lupao, all of the province of Nueva Ecija, into an independent municipality under the name of Talugtug	December 20, 1947
114	Requiring public bidding, under certain conditions, for award of contracts for repair or construction works to be entered into by the corporations owned or controlled by the Government	December 27, 1947
115	Fixing the date of organization and the territorial jurisdiction of the city of Dagupan	December 31, 1947

== 1948 ==
No.	Title	Date signed
116	Amending Executive Order No. 85, so as to postpone the organization of the municipality of Calamba, province of Occidental Misamis	January 1, 1948
117	Further amending Paragraph 1 of Executive Order No. 320, dated January 27, 1941, entitled "Regulating the maintenance and operation of race tracks and horse racing"	January 2, 1948
118	Amending Executive Order Numbered Eighteen, dated September Sixteen Nineteen Hundred and Forty-Six, entitled "Establishing the organization and operation of the Department of Foreign Affairs and of the Foreign Service of the Republic of the Philippines and fixing the emoluments, privileges and allowances of the officers and employees thereof	January 9, 1948
119	Declaring that portion of the Benguet Road (Kennon Road) from Klondyke's Spring to Camp Six within the Mountain Province a toll road and fixing a schedule of fees for the collection of tolls thereon	February 6, 1948
120	Regulating boxing and wrestling contests or exhibitions	February 26, 1948
121	Extending further the periods provided for in Sections 3, 5, and 6 of Republic Act No. 17, entitled "An Act to provide for the circulation of treasury certificates with the Official Seal of the Republic of the Philippines stamped, printed or superimposed thereon, for the other purposes," as amended by Republic Act No. 92	February 28, 1948
122	Organizing certain portion of the municipality of Mambajao, province of Oriental Misamis, into an independent municipality under the name of Mahinog	March 19, 1948
123	Fixing office hours during the hot season	March 19, 1948
124	Abolishing the municipal districts of Borboanan, Macopa, Pili and Tagbayani in the province of Surigao and annexing the territories thereof to the municipalities of Bislig and Surigao, same province	March 23, 1948
125	Abolishing the municipal district of Bannagao in the province of Isabela and annexing the territories thereof to the municipal district of Aurora, same province	March 23, 1948
126	Organizing a certain portion of the municipality of Iligan, province of Lanao, into an independent municipality under the name of Kauswagan	March 29, 1948
127	Transferring the seat of government of the Municipality of Longos, province of Laguna, from the Poblacion of Longos to the barrio of San Juan of the same municipality	March 30, 1948
